Lucas Simon Pierre Tousart (born 29 April 1997) is a French footballer who plays as a midfielder for Bundesliga club Hertha BSC. He has also represented the France national youth teams starting from France U19, and also the France Olympic football team.

Club career

Valenciennes
Tousart made his debut for the Ligue 2 side on 24 January 2015 against Tours. He played the whole match in a 2–1 home loss.

Lyon
Tousart made his Lyon debut on 5 December 2015 in a Ligue 1 match against Angers. He was replaced by Clement Grenier after 61 minutes in a 2–0 home loss.
He scored his first professional goal on 16 February 2017 in a UEFA Europa League game against Dutch side AZ Alkmaar, scoring the first goal in an eventual 4–1 victory.

Hertha BSC
On 27 January 2020, Tousart signed with Bundesliga side Hertha BSC. He was however sent back to Lyon on loan until the end of the season. While on loan to Lyon, Tousart volleyed in the game's only goal as Lyon shocked Juventus in the first leg of their Champions League Round of 16 tie. It was announced in June 2020 that Tousart would join Hertha on 1 July, meaning that Tousart would be unable to take part in Lyon's postponed Champions League match following the COVID-19 pandemic.

Career statistics

Honours
Lyon
 Coupe de la Ligue runner-up: 2019–20

France U19
UEFA European Under-19 Championship: 2016

Individual
UEFA European Under-19 Championship Team of the Tournament: 2016

References

External links

Profile at the Hertha BSC website

1997 births
Living people
Sportspeople from Arras
Footballers from Hauts-de-France
Association football midfielders
French footballers
France youth international footballers
France under-21 international footballers
Valenciennes FC players
Olympique Lyonnais players
Hertha BSC players
Ligue 1 players
Ligue 2 players
Bundesliga players
French expatriate footballers
Expatriate footballers in Germany
French expatriate sportspeople in Germany
Olympic footballers of France
Footballers at the 2020 Summer Olympics